Bulgarian train (Macedonian and ), in Bulgaria known as Indian string, is a method of vote-rigging with the goal of influencing the election process through the control of ballots. The term was coined by the media in Bosnia and Herzegovina ahead of the country's general election in October 2010, and has since been used to refer to similar techniques used during elections in some of the ex-Yugoslav republics. The name of the method originates from its widespread use during the European Parliament election held in Bulgaria in June 2009, at which analysts' estimates indicate that 200,000-350,000 votes were sold or coerced.

Description 
Bulgarian train is, in fact, a method of vote-buying that includes a recurrent process of casting pre-filled ballots. The process starts when political 'handlers' distribute pre-filled ballots in front of polling stations. The voters who are willing to sell their ballots take them into the polling stations, where they obtain empty ones, and cast their pre-filled ones. Then, they go back outside and hand the empty ballots to the handlers, who fill them in and give over to the next voters.

Use

Bulgaria 
The method was massively used in Bulgaria during the European Parliament election in June and the parliamentary election in July 2009. The voters willing to sell their vote were primarily from the Roma community. Analysts estimate that the number of people who sold or coerced their vote in this way ranges from 200,000 to 350,000 at each election. Consequently, the name of the method has become eponymous with Bulgaria.

North Macedonia 
The implementation of the method was reportedly prevented in Struga during the Macedonian parliamentary election in December 2016.

Serbia 
Bulgarian train was reported during the 2016 Serbian parliamentary election, during the 2020 Serbian parliamentary election, and during the 2022 presidential and parliamentary election.

Bosnia and Herzegovina 
Bulgarian train was reported in Teslić during the Bosnian general election in October 2014, when the voting process was interrupted until the suspicious person was cleared from the polling station.

Hungary 
A variation of the Bulgarian train was reported in Hungary used by Fidesz primarily buying votes from the Roma community in the 2014 and 2018 elections.

Controversies 
The use of the term "Bulgarian train" sparked controversies in Bulgaria, where it is considered offensive and the same technique of vote-rigging is known as "Indian string" (Bulgarian: индианска нишка; the adjective "Indian" in this term refers to Native American, as opposed to a term reflecting the country of India, which would be "индийски" in Bulgarian). In a research paper on the vote-rigging in Bulgarian elections published in 2010, Bulgarian political scientist Georgi Manolov avoids the use of names associated with specific countries or ethnicities. He refers to the fraudulent techniques as 'vote trading' and the recurrent process of vote-rigging simply as 'train'.

See also 
 Carousel voting

References

Politics of Bulgaria
Electoral fraud